Maria Giulia Amadasi Guzzo is a leading scholar in Semitic epigraphy. She is Professor of Semitic Epigraphy at the Department of Sciences of Antiquity of the Sapienza University of Rome, and the director of the "Museum of the Near East" of the University La Sapienza. She is a corresponding member of the German Archaeological Institute.

Amadasi participated as an epigrapher in the archaeological missions of the University of Rome in Mozia, Monte Sirai, Tas Silg (Malta); of the Missions, most recently, of the Universities of Naples and Florence and Bologna in Tell Barri and Tell Afis (Syria). Amadasi also carried out epigraphic missions with the University of Rome and CNR) in Cyprus and Tripolitania in  Libya.

Amadasi published the Phoenician inscriptions of the sanctuary of Astarte in Malta and the Phoenician archives of the city of Idalion in Cyprus. She is the author of an extensive bibliography on the history of writing, grammar and Semitic epigraphy.

Selected works

Sources 

Epigraphers
Italian scholars
Academic staff of the Sapienza University of Rome
Phoenician-Punic studies
Year of birth missing (living people)
Living people